One Step Away is a 2014 Chinese suspense romance film directed by Zhao Baogang. It was released on September 19, 2014.

Cast
Sun Honglei
Gwei Lun-mei
Alex Fong
Xu Jinglei
Huang Lei
Jiang Qinqin
Ada Choi
Xi Meijuan
Fang Jun
Duanmu Chonghui
Li Hua
Tan Kai

Theme song
 "Ai Bu Ke Ji" (爱不可及)
 Lyrics: Lin Xi
 Music: Zhang Yadong
 Singer: Faye Wong

Reception
By September 28, it had earned ¥69.87 million at the Chinese box office.

References

2010s romance films
China Film Group Corporation films
Chinese romance films
Chinese suspense films